Laetesia leo is a species of sheet weaver found in South Australia. It was described by van Helsdingen in 1972.

References

Linyphiidae
Spiders of Australia
Spiders described in 1972